Red Bee can refer to:

 Ericsson Broadcast and Media Services — a United Kingdom based media management company, formerly known as Red Bee Media
 Red Bee, a creative division of the above company that retains the brand
 Red Bee (character) — a Quality Comics superhero from the 1940s revived by DC Comics